Algirdas Monkevičius (born 29 March 1956) is a teacher and Lithuanian politician, who is the former Minister of Education and Science.

Biography 

In 1974 he finished Rietavas secondary school, and in 1979 Šiauliai Pedagogical Institute, Physics and mathematics faculty and started working as a teacher. Later Monkevičius continued his studies in Moscow.

Monkevičius has been a member of New Union (Social Liberals) since 2000, and with this party he was elected a member of Seimas in 2000–2004 and in 2004–2008, was Minister of Education in three Cabinets of Lithuania.

References

External links
 Members of the Seimas – Algirdas Monkevičius. Seimas (Parliament) of Lithuania.

Lithuanian schoolteachers
Ministers of Education and Science of Lithuania
Living people
1956 births
Recipients of the Order of the Cross of Terra Mariana, 2nd Class
People from Rietavas
Members of the Seimas
21st-century Lithuanian politicians
New Union (Social Liberals) politicians
Šiauliai Pedagogical Institute alumni